Avian coronavirus 9203 is a species of coronavirus in the genus Gammacoronavirus.

References

Gammacoronaviruses